Francis Xavier Desnoyers (July 29, 1813August 13, 1868) was an American merchant, politician, and Wisconsin pioneer.  He was the 2nd mayor of Green Bay, Wisconsin, and served in the Wisconsin State Assembly in the 1854 session.

Biography
Desnoyers was born on July 29, 1813, in Detroit, Michigan Territory, the son of Peter J. Desnoyers and his wife Marie.

He married Louisa A. Baird of Philadelphia, Pennsylvania, and had three children. Their son, Frank, would also become mayor of Green Bay. Frank married Leila Lindsley, the daughter of former Green Bay mayor M. P. Lindsley. Francis X. Desnoyers died on August 13, 1868, aged 55.

Political career
Desnoyers was mayor of Green Bay in 1855. He also served as an alderman. He was a Republican.

References

Wisconsin city council members
Mayors of Green Bay, Wisconsin
Wisconsin Republicans
Politicians from Detroit
Place of death missing
1813 births
1868 deaths
19th-century American politicians